Sarah Palin: You Betcha! is a 2011 documentary film about Sarah Palin. Directed by Nick Broomfield and Joan Churchill, the film was produced by Marc Hoeferlin and Cassian Elwes and edited by Michael X. Flores. Shani Hinton, Sophie Watts and Gregory Unruh executive produced. The documentary premiered at the 2011 Toronto International Film Festival. $31,120 was raised through Kickstarter for the film's distribution and advertising. The film received a limited release in the United States on September 30, 2011.

See also
 The Undefeated, another documentary about Sarah Palin exploring the events of her Wasilla mayorship, Alaskan governorship and run for the vice presidential office.

References

External links

Films directed by Nick Broomfield
2011 films
2011 documentary films
Documentary films about American politicians
Sarah Palin
American documentary films
Documentary films about women in the United States
2010s English-language films
2010s American films